Grzegorzewski (feminine Grzegorzewska) is a Polish surname. Notable people with the surname include:

 Jakub Grzegorzewski (born 1982), Polish footballer
 Wioletta Grzegorzewska (born 1974), Polish poet and writer
 Alexander Grzegorzewski, Famous physicist

Polish-language surnames